The 2012–13 Cagliari Calcio season is the 93rd season in club history.

Players

Current squad

Out on loan

Matches

Legend

Serie A

Coppa Italia

Squad statistics

Appearances and goals

|-
! colspan="10" style="background:#dcdcdc; text-align:center"| Goalkeepers

|-
! colspan="10" style="background:#dcdcdc; text-align:center"| Defenders

|-
! colspan="10" style="background:#dcdcdc; text-align:center"| Midfielders

|-
! colspan="10" style="background:#dcdcdc; text-align:center"| Forwards

|-
! colspan="10" style="background:#dcdcdc; text-align:center"| Players transferred out during the season

Top scorers
This includes all competitive matches.  The list is sorted by shirt number when total goals are equal.

Last updated: 28 October 2012
Source: Competitions

Sources

Cagliari Calcio
Cagliari Calcio seasons